Townley Hall is a Georgian country house which stands in parkland at Tullyallen some 5 km west of Drogheda, County Louth in the Republic of Ireland. It was designed by Irish architect Francis Johnston for the Townley Balfour family and built between 1794 and 1798.

The house is  square, built in local stone with simple neoclassical lines, broken only by a Doric portico. The interior is dominated by a spiral staircase in a domed rotunda.

History
The Townley estate had belonged to the Townley family since Cromwellian times. Blayney Townley, MP had inherited the wealth of his nephew, William Balfour, in 1739 and added Balfour to his surname. The Townley estate passed to his grandson, also Blayney Townley Balfour, later the MP for Belturbet, who in 1794 commissioned Francis Johnston to design the present house. Other buildings on the site, which were designed by Johnston, include the entrance gates and gate lodge, a dovecote, walled garden, farmyard and farmyard houses.

Mrs Townley Balfour, wife of the grandson of Blayney jnr, died childless in 1955 and the property passed to her cousin David Crichton.

The house is now owned by the School of Philosophy and Economic Science, a registered charity based in Ballsbridge Dublin, who use it as a residential study centre.

The house and grounds are private and access is strictly by appointment.

Residents

Among the residents of Townley Hall were, according to documents held by national Library of Ireland (MS 50,863).

 Anne Mary Balfour (1820–95).
 Blayney Balfour Townley (1832)
 Blayney Reynell Townley Esq. (head of household 1911)
 Elizabeth Sarah Balfour (1820–60).
 Florence Henrietta Townley Balfour (1881–93).
 John Willoughby Cole, 2nd Earl Enniskillen 1833
 Kathleen Balfour (1820–60).
 Letitia Frances Balfour (1828–85)
 Lowry Vessey Townley Balfour.
 Madeline Elizabeth Townley (1867-1955)
 Mary Frances Balfour (1820–60).
 Rev. William Townley Balfour (1888–95).

(Eight servants in 1911).

See also 
 Beaulieu House and Gardens
 Dowth Hall

References

External links 

 Website of the estate
 

History of County Louth
Drogheda
Houses in County Louth